was originally created by Leiji Matsumoto as an educational-like video aimed more at children. It used information about Earth and Outer Space which lead many to believe it as an educational video. It was first shown only as a film in the Expo '85 as part of the World Fair.  It was also Leiji Matsumoto's first work with computer graphics in it. The same year it was published a single-volume comic adaptation cured by Sekai Bunkasha.

Plot

The story follows Daichi Meguru and Mayu, a young boy and a pilot, as they flee their war torn planet and into space. Upon their ship a stowaway android named Zero joins their quest as they travel through Halley's Mirror.

Theme Songs

"We Will Be One Someday" by Satoko Shimonari
Lyrics: Kayoko Fuyumori
Composed: Yuri Nishimura

"Aoi Mizuumi" by Satoko Shimonari
Lyrics: Kayoko Fuyumori
Composed: Yuri Nishimura

Cast

Daichi Meguru Keiko Toda
Mayu Yōko Asagami
Zero Hideyuki Tanaka
Linne Hiromi Tsuru
Universal Consciousness Reiko Mutô

Media

The movie was only shown once and was then released on VHS. Very few media or products were released, except for a few at the Expo. There has been no DVD or Blu-ray release.

A soundtrack was released as a vinyl record.

Notes

References

External links

Arei no Kagami Way to the Virgin Space on Leijiverse.com

Leiji Matsumoto
1985 manga
Toei Animation films